The Lambda Literary Award for Mystery is an annual literary award, presented by the Lambda Literary Foundation, to a mystery novel by or about people in the LGBT community. Prior to 2021, the award was separated into separate categories for Gay and Lesbian Mystery.

Recipients

References 

Awards established in 2021
Mystery
English-language literary awards
Lists of LGBT-related award winners and nominees
2021 establishments in the United States
Awards established in 1989
1989 establishments in the United States